Master commandant was a rank within the early United States Navy. Both the Continental Navy, started in 1775, and the United States Navy created by the United States Congress, in 1796, had just two commissioned ranks, lieutenant and captain.  Master commandant, who would command smaller vessels, was used, unofficially, as early as 1799.  The rank was made official in 1806.  The name of the rank was changed to "commander" in 1837.

The early U.S. Navy had three "grades" of officer who were typically placed in charge of warships: captain; master commandant; and lieutenant, commanding (which was not a distinct rank, but a title given to an ordinary lieutenant).  That structure remains largely in place in the modern American Navy, with the distinct ranks of captain, commander, and lieutenant commander.

Master commandant was roughly equivalent to the Royal Navy rank of master and commander, which itself was shortened to "commander" in 1794.  When he was in command of a ship, such as a sloop or brig, a master commandant would be addressed as "captain" by the sailors on board.  

Contemporary paintings show a master commandant's uniform main difference from a captain's uniform was that while a Captain wore an epaulet on each shoulder a master commandant's uniform had a single epaulet on the right shoulder, and a lieutenant commandant wore a single epaulet on the left shoulder.

American naval hero Stephen Decatur notably never held the rank of master commandant. After leading a daring raid to destroy the captured U.S. frigate  in Tripoli Harbor in 1804, Decatur returned to the U.S. as a national hero and was given a direct promotion from lieutenant to captain.

Also in 1804, Master Commandant Richard Somers led a dozen volunteer sailors on USS Intrepid—loaded with explosives—toward the pirate fleet in the harbor of Tripoli, Libya.

In 1825 a master commandant was paid $60 per month, while a captain of a ship with 20–32 cannons was paid $75 per month.  A lieutenant commandant was paid $50 per month, while a lieutenant or a sailing master earned $40 per month.  Midshipmen earned $19 per month.  Captains of ships with more than 32 cannons earned $100 per month.

References

Further reading
 

+
Military ranks of the United States Navy